The Miller of Burgundy (sometimes spelled Burgandy) is a 1912 American silent film drama produced by Oscar Eagle. The film stars Frank Weed and Adrienne Kroell.

Plot
In the picturesque little province of Burgundy in Eastern France, there lived an old miller named Meunier.  With him, the joy of his heart and administrator to his simple needs, lived his daughter Louise, she of the dancing eyes and roughish beauty. Meunier enjoyed the respect of the simple easy going peasantry thereabouts and, from profits of his grist mill, he was enabled to live in a comparative comfort and contentment.  This happy condition was interrupted when one Monsieur Bontemps, a rich Parisian financier and mill speculator, decided that he need Meunier's mill. To his offers, the miller however, turned a deaf ear and when Bontemp's son was sent to either purchase Meunier's mill, or start one in opposition, the old miller's future looked dark and foreboding.  How the opposition mill was started, and how young Bontemps, having met with a serious accident, was nursed and cared for by Louise and her father; of how the Elder Bontemps himself, met with an accident and how this incident awakened him to a realization of his greed, all combine to make one of the sweetest stories of that year.  It is pictured in a simple, charming manner amid the quaint, picturesque backgrounds of that romantic country.

Cast
 Frank Weed - an old miller
 Adrienne Kroell - Louise Meunier
 Thomas Commerford - Bontemps (Bontempts), billed as T. J. Comberford
 Allen Mathes - Charles Bomtenps
 Barbery Swager - a stenographer
 Fred Bernard - a doctor
 Julius Frankenburg - a collector
 Charles Barney - a waiter

References

External links
 

1912 films
1912 drama films
American silent short films
1912 short films
Silent American drama films
American black-and-white films
1910s American films
1910s English-language films
American drama short films